Lethe rohria, the common treebrown, is a species of satyrine butterfly found in Asia.

Description

Males and females: Upperside van Dyke brown, slightly darker, especially in the female, towards apex of forewing.

Male. Forewing: a costal and two preapical spots white. Hindwing: the ocelli (eyespots) of the underside showing through, sometimes forming two or three obscure black spots; two slender subterminal black lines. Underside paler, shaded with dark brown. Forewing: narrow subbasal and outer cellular transverse sinuous white lines; an irregular broad discal and a narrower postdiscal band white, forming a V, the latter bearing a series of four blind, dusky-black, fulvous-ringed ocelli; the two preapical white spots as on the upperside. Distinct slender subterminal whitish and broader terminal ochraceous lines. Hindwing: a subbasal transverse sinuous white line; a postdiscal arched series of six black ocelli, their centres disintegrated, their inner ring ochraceous, outer brown, and the whole series bordered inwardly and outwardly by lilacine (lilac-coloured) white lines; finally a slender white subterminal and a broader ochraceous terminal line as on the forewing.

Female upperside differs in having a broad, oblique, white, discal band on the forewing and a spot below its posterior end in interspace 1, the inner border of the band bi-emarginate, the outer irregularly sinuous. Underside as in the male, but the markings more pronounced, the white discal band on forewing very prominent. Antennae, head, thorax and abdomen brown; antennae preapically black, at apex ochraceous.

Range
The Himalayas from India (Uttarakhand, Sikkim and Assam), Bhutan, Myanmar (Tenasserim) and extending to China.

Subspecies
Race nilgiriensis, Guerin. Male. Differs only from the male of the typical form in having on the upperside of the forewing an additional white spot placed terminally in interspace 2; the female differs from the female of the typical form in having on the upperside of the forewing the discal white band divided into three distinct well-separated white spots, and on the underside in the same band being distinctly narrower.

Central and southern India; recorded on the western side as far north as Mount Abu; Ceylon.

Larva
"Fusiform, elongated; head conical, the vertex being prolonged to an acute point projecting forward and anal segment also prolonged to a point projecting backwards. Colour green, with darker dorsal and lateral stripes and a slight ochreous subdorsal stripe" (Moore.) "Feeds on grasses" (Green).

Gallery

References

rohria
Butterflies described in 1787
Butterflies of Asia
Butterflies of Indochina